The 1899 Baltimore Orioles season was a season in American baseball. It was the Orioles' 18th season in the major leagues, their 8th in the National League, and their last overall.

After the 1898 season, Orioles owner Harry Von der Horst acquired a controlling interest in the Brooklyn Bridegrooms ballclub and moved most of his star players and manager Ned Hanlon over to the Brooklyn team. The remaining team played the season under first year manager John McGraw and still won 86 games and finished in fourth place. After the season, the National League contracted and the Baltimore franchise was folded. The remaining players either were absorbed into Brooklyn or released to sign with another club.

Regular season

Season standings

Record vs. opponents

Roster

Player stats

Batting

Starters by position 
Note: Pos = Position; G = Games played; AB = At bats; H = Hits; Avg. = Batting average; HR = Home runs; RBI = Runs batted in

Other batters 
Note: G = Games played; AB = At bats; H = Hits; Avg. = Batting average; HR = Home runs; RBI = Runs batted in

Pitching

Starting pitchers 
Note: G = Games pitched; IP = Innings pitched; W = Wins; L = Losses; ERA = Earned run average; SO = Strikeouts

Other pitchers 
Note: G = Games pitched; IP = Innings pitched; W = Wins; L = Losses; ERA = Earned run average; SO = Strikeouts

References 
1899 Baltimore Orioles season at Baseball Reference
1899 Baltimore Orioles team page at www.baseball-almanac.com

Baltimore Orioles (1882–1899) seasons
Baltimore Orioles season
1899 in sports in Maryland